The last antecedent rule is a doctrine of interpretation of a statute, by which "Referential and qualifying phrases, where no contrary intention appears, refer solely to the last antecedent."  The rule is typically bound by "common sense" and is flexible enough to avoid application that "would involve an absurdity, do violence to the plain intent of the language, or if the context for other reason requires a deviation from the rule."

Further qualifications have been noted to application of the rule:

A more formulaic approach to the rule requires, "Evidence that a qualifying phrase is supposed to apply to all antecedents instead of only to the immediately preceding one may be found in the fact that it is separated from the antecedents by a comma."  Kenneth A. Adams, author of A Manual of Style for Contract Drafting, has criticized this canon of construction as being applied inconsistently and contrary to the guidance of many manuals of style:

The last antecedent rule is also applied to contract interpretation.

“A contrary rule of construction is that when a clause follows several words in a statute and is applicable as much to the first word as to the others in the list, the clause should be applied to all of the words which preceded it.”

References

See also

Rules of law
Four corners

Grammar rules
Possessive antecedent
Syntax

Statutory law
Common law legal terminology
Contract law legal terminology
Common law rules